If I Was She is a 2004 French-Belgian television drama film directed by Stéphane Clavier.

Synopsis 
Alex, a macho man separated from his wife, suddenly finds himself transformed into a blonde woman. To hide her identity, she calls herself Alice and tries with her female body to win back his wife.

Cast 
 Hélène de Fougerolles as Alice
 Hippolyte Girardot as Alex
 Thierry Lhermitte as Didier
 Alexia Portal as Léa
 Éric Caravaca as Nicolas
 Catherine Demaiffe as The Secretary
 Cathy Boquet as The Beautician
 Mathilde Nardone as Sophie
 Eva Nardone as Zoé
 Julie Mbali as Sandrine
 Laëtitia de Ridder as Jennifer
 Yves Claessens as The Boss
 Laurence Katina as The Fashion Journalist
 Jacky Druault as The Repairer

References 

2004 in French television
Films directed by Stéphane Clavier